Fernand Tovondray (born 12 May 1944) is a Malagasy athlete. He competed in both the men's 110 metres hurdles and the men's high jump at the 1968 Summer Olympics, coming 7th and 30th place, respectively.

References

1944 births
Living people
Athletes (track and field) at the 1968 Summer Olympics
Malagasy male hurdlers
Malagasy male high jumpers
Olympic athletes of Madagascar
Place of birth missing (living people)